Laurent Joffrin (born 30 June 1952) is a French journalist and the editor of the newspaper Libération.

Selected publications

 La Gauche en voie de disparition, Éditions du Seuil, 1984 
 Coluche, c'est l'histoire d'un mec, with Serge July and Jacques Lanzmann, Solar, 1986 
 Un coup de jeune, portrait d'une génération morale, Arléa, 1987 
 Mai 68, une histoire du mouvement, Seuil, 1988  ; rééd. Points Histoire, series "Document", 2008 
 Cabu en Amérique, with Jean-Claude Guillebaud, Seuil, 1990 
 La Régression française, Seuil, 1992 
 La Gauche retrouvée, Seuil, 1994 
 Yougoslavie, suicide d'une nation, Mille et Une Nuits, 1995 
 Kosovo, la guerre du droit, followed by Yougoslavie, suicide d'une nation, Mille et Une Nuits, 1999 
 Où est passée l'autorité ?, with Philippe Tesson, NiL Éditions, 2000
 Les Batailles de Napoléon, Seuil, 2000 
 Le Gouvernement invisible, naissance d'une démocratie sans le peuple, Arléa, 2001 
 La Princesse oubliée, novel, Éditions Robert Laffont, 2002 
 C'était nous, novel, Robert Laffont, 2004 
 Les Grandes batailles navales, de Salamine à Midway, Seuil, 2005 
 Histoire de la gauche caviar, Robert Laffont, 2006 
 La Gauche bécassine, Robert Laffont, 2007 
 Le Roi est nu, Robert Laffont, 2008 
 Média-paranoïa, Seuil, 2009 
 La Grande histoire des codes secrets, Privé, May 2009 
 L'Énigme de la rue Saint Nicaise – Les aventures de Donatien Lachance, détective de Napoléon, Robert Laffont, 2010 
 Les Énigmes Kennedy, Omnibus, 2011 
 Le Grand Complot, Laffont, 2013 
 Le Réveil français, Stock, 2015

References

External links 

1952 births
Living people
People from Vincennes
20th-century French journalists
21st-century French journalists
French newspaper editors
Sciences Po alumni
Collège Stanislas de Paris alumni
French male journalists
French male non-fiction writers